The Royal Asiatic Society of Great Britain and Ireland, commonly known as the Royal Asiatic Society, was established, according to its royal charter of 11 August 1824, to further "the investigation of subjects connected with and for the encouragement of science, literature and the arts in relation to Asia."  From its incorporation the society has been a forum, through lectures, its journal, and other publications, for scholarship relating to Asian culture and society of the highest level.  It is the United Kingdom's senior learned society in the field of Asian studies. Fellows of the society are elected regularly and include highly accomplished and notable scholars of Asian studies; they use the post-nominal letters FRAS.

History
The society was founded at London in 1823, with the first general meeting being held on 15 March at the Thatched House on St James's Street, London, chaired by Henry Thomas Colebrooke. This meeting elected the officers (including Charles Williams-Wynn as the first president) and council, defined that the name of the society was the Asiatic Society of Great Britain and Ireland, and that members should be designated Members of the Asiatic Society (MAS). It also empowered the council to frame regulations (these were approved at the next general meeting on 19 April), to look for a suitable site for the society's meetings, and to seek a charter of incorporation. Later that year, at a general meeting held on 7 June, Williams-Wynn announced that King George IV, who had already agreed to be patron of the society, had granted the title of "Royal" to the society, giving it the name of the Royal Asiatic Society of Great Britain and Ireland and its members the designation Members of the Royal Asiatic Society (MRAS). The society received its charter under that name on 11 August 1824.

The Royal Asiatic Society was established by a group primarily composed of notable scholars and colonial administrators. It was intended to be the British counterpart to the Asiatic Society of Calcutta, which had been founded in 1784 by the noted Sanskrit scholar and jurist Sir William Jones. A leading figure in the foundation of the Royal Asiatic Society was Henry Thomas Colebrooke, who was himself an important Sanskrit scholar, and one time President of the Asiatic Society of Calcutta. Another was Sir George Staunton, 2nd Baronet, a Chinese-speaking diplomat who had worked in China.

When the Oriental Club of London was formed in 1824, membership of the Royal Asiatic Society was stated as one of the four qualifications for membership of the new club.

Due to the nature of the society's close connection with the British Empire in the east, much of the work originating with the society has been focused on topics concerning the Indian subcontinent. However, the purview of the Society extends far beyond India: all of Asia and into Islamic North Africa, and Ethiopia are included. The Society does have a few limitations on its field on interest, such as recent political history and current affairs. This particular moratorium led to the founding of the Central Asian Society, which later became the Royal Society for Asian Affairs. After World War II, with the gradual end of British political hegemony 'east of Suez', the Society maintained its disinterested academic focus on Asia.

Originally, members of the society were styled Members (MRAS), Honorary Members (Hon. MRAS), Corresponding Members (CMRAS) and Foreign Members (FMRAS). By the 1870s, the post-nominal letters FRAS, indicating fellowship of the society, were being used by some members, including the physician and writer on India John Forbes Watson, and the writer on India and co-founder of the India Reform Society John Dickinson. This usage continued through the twentieth century, advertisements in the Society's Journal also reflecting the use of the letters FRAS by some members, although all members of the society were referred to as "members" in the 1908 constitution, and it was not until 1967 that reports of the Anniversary Meeting referred to "fellows" rather than "members". , members are designated "fellows" or "student fellows"; no post-nominals are assigned by the society to these grades in its regulations, but the use of the post-nominal letters FRAS is recognized in numerous reference works. The post-nominal letters are used by some academics working in Asia-related fields, and have been used in the society's journal in reference to the Indologist Dr Michael D. Willis, and to the poet and translator of Bengali Dr William Radice and the Islamic scholar Leonard Lewisohn.

Notable members and fellows of the society have included Rabindranath Tagore, Sir Aurel Stein, Sir Wilfred Thesiger, and George V. Tsereteli.

Branches
The society is affiliated with associate societies in India (Calcutta, Mumbai, Bangalore, Madras, and Bihar), the former branch in Mumbai now being known as the Asiatic Society of Mumbai.

It is also affiliated with the Royal Asiatic Society of Sri Lanka, the Royal Asiatic Society Hong Kong Branch (established in 1847), the Asiatic Society of Japan (established in 1875), the Malaysian Branch of the Royal Asiatic Society (established in 1877), and Royal Asiatic Society Korea Branch (established in 1900).

In China, the former South China Branch is now known as the Hong Kong Branch. The North China branch has been re-established in 2006 in Shanghai as the Royal Asiatic Society China, the original branch having been founded in 1857 and dissolved in 1952. It has chapters in Suzhou and Beijing.

Journal
The Journal of the Royal Asiatic Society is published by Cambridge University Press four times a year, each issue containing a number of scholarly essays, and several book reviews. It has been published under its current name since 1991, having previously been the Journal of the Royal Asiatic Society of Great Britain and Ireland (1834–1991) and Transactions of the Royal Asiatic Society of Great Britain and Ireland (1824–1834). The present editor of the journal is Professor Sarah Ansari of Royal Holloway, University of London.  The executive editor is Charlotte de Blois. The society also regularly publishes historical manuscripts, and monographs of the highest academic quality on numerous topics.

Oriental Translation Fund of Great Britain and Ireland
This fund was initially established in 1828. The results of its initial funding projects were soon forthcoming. The Fund became one of a large number of Victorian subscription printing clubs which published translations, re-issued historical works or commissioned original books which were too specialized for commercial publication; but unlike most of those now defunct organizations, the work of the Royal Asiatic Society Oriental Translation Fund is on-going into the 21st century with a "new series" and "old series" microform catalog available for scholarly research.

Other Royal Asiatic Society prizes and awards
For full details and recipients, see the Royal Asiatic Society's website.
 Research Fellowships: Dr Michael Willis and Professor Peter Flügel.
 The Sir George Staunton Prize - awarded to a young scholar (completing a PhD, or having completed a PhD within the previous five years) for an article related to the history, archaeology, literature, language, religion, anthropology and art of Asia. 
 The Surya P. Subedi Prize - an annual prize awarded for a publication on Nepal.
 The Royal Asiatic Society’s New Barwis-Holliday Award - awarded for and article on new unpublished research on the 
 The Royal Asiatic Society Award - awarded every three years in recognition of outstanding contribution to scholarship in the field of Asian Studies (this award replaced the Royal Asiatic Society Gold Medal).
 The Sir Richard Burton Medal - awarded to scholars and travellers within Asia.
 The Denis Sinor Medal - awarded to scholars in the field of Inner Asian Studies.

President
Currently (2021–), the President of the Society is Professor Sarah Ansari and the vice-president is Dr. B. Brend.

Past presidents

 2018-2021 Anthony Stockwell
 2015-2018 Gordon Johnson 
 2012–2015 Peter Robb
 2009–2012 Gordon Johnson
 2006–2009 Anthony Stockwell
 2003–2006 Francis Robinson
 2000–2003 Anthony Stockwell
 1997–2000 Francis Robinson
 1993–?1997 David W. MacDowall
 1990–1993 Prof. Adrian David Hugh Bivar
 1988–1990 Frank Steele
 1979–1988 Sir Cyril Philips
 1976-1979 Charles Fraser Beckingham
 1973–1976 Prof. E.H.S. Simmonds
 1970–1973 Basil William Robinson
 1967–1970 Charles Fraser Beckingham
 1964–1967 Prof. Sir Harold Walter Bailey
 1961–1964 Sir Richard Olaf Winstedt
 1958–1961 Gerard L.M. Clauson
 1955–1958 Sir Richard Olaf Winstedt
 1952–1955 Sir Ralph Lilley Turner
 1949–1952 Sir Richard Olaf Winstedt
 1946–1949 The Earl of Scarbrough
 1943–1946 Sir Richard Olaf Winstedt
 1940-1943 Viscount Samuel
 1939-1940 Freeman Freeman-Thomas, 1st Marquess of Willingdon
 1937–1939 Malcolm Hailey, 1st Baron Hailey
 1934–1937 David Samuel Margoliouth
 1931–1934 Edward Douglas Maclagan
 1928–1931 Lawrence Dundas, 2nd Marquess of Zetland
 1925–1928 Edward Douglas Maclagan
 1922-1925 Robert Chalmers, 1st Baron Chalmers
 1921–1922 Richard Carnac Temple
 1893–1921 Donald James Mackay, 11th Lord Reay
 1890–1893 Thomas George Baring
 1887–1890 Thomas Francis Wade
 1884–1887 William Muir
 1882–1884 Sir Henry Bartle Edward Frere (2nd term)
 1881 Sir Thomas Edward Colebrooke 
 1878–1881 Henry Creswicke Rawlinson
 1875–1878 Sir Thomas Edward Colebrooke 
 1872–1875 Sir Henry Bartle Edward Frere
 1869–1871 Henry Creswicke Rawlinson
 1867–1869 Percy Smythe, 8th Viscount Strangford
 1864–1867 Sir Thomas Edward Colebrooke
 1861–1864 Percy Smythe, 8th Viscount Strangford
 1858      William Henry Sykes
 1855–1858 Horace Hayman Wilson
 1852–1855 William Baring, 2nd Baron Ashburton
 1849–1852 Lord Ellesmere
 1843–1849 Earl of Auckland 
 1842–1843 Lord Fitzgerald and Vesey (died in office)
 1841–1842 George Augustus Frederick Fitzclarence (died in office)
 1823–1841 Charles Williams-Wynn

See also
Fellows of The Royal Asiatic Society of Great Britain and Ireland
Journal of the Malaysian Branch of the Royal Asiatic Society
Royal Asiatic Society of Sri Lanka
Royal Asiatic Society Korea Branch
Royal Asiatic Society Hong Kong Branch
Royal Asiatic Society China

References

Some Society publications
"Charter of Incorporation of the Royal Asiatic Society of Great Britain and Ireland." Journal of the Royal Asiatic Society. pp 25–27, 1957.
Beckingham, C.F. Centenary Volume of the Royal Asiatic Society of Great Britain and Ireland 1823-1923. Pargiter, F.E. (ed.) Published by the Society, 1923, London.
Mashita, Hiroyuki. Theology, Ethics and Metaphysics: Royal Asiatic Society Classics of Islam. Routledge Publishing, 2003.
Royal Asiatic Society of Great Britain and Ireland. B. W. Robinson. Persian Paintings in the Collection of the Royal Asiatic Society Routledge, 1998.
Rost, Reinhold. "Miscellaneous Papers Relating to Indo-China and the Indian Archipelago" Reprinted for the Straits Branch of the Royal Asiatic Society, from the "Journals" of the Royal Asiatic, Bengal Asiatic, and Royal Geographical Societies; the "Transactions" and "Journal" of the Asiatic Society of Batavia ... Royal Asiatic Society of Great Britain and Ireland Malayan Branch Published by Trübner & co., 1887.
Tritton, Arthur Stanley. Muslim Theology... Royal Asiatic Society by Luzac, 1947.
 Winternitz, Moriz (compiled), Frederick William Thomas (appendix). A Catalogue of South Indian Sanskrit Manuscripts: Especially Those of the Whish Collection Belonging to the Royal Asiatic Society of Great Britain and Ireland. Royal Asiatic Society of Great Britain and Ireland Library. Whish Collection, 1902.

Journal of the Royal Asiatic Society

Catalogues

Miscellaneous

Leyden, John. (2013). Miscellaneous Papers Relating to Indo-China and the Indian Archipelago, Reprinted for the Straits Branch of the Royal Asiatic Society. London: Forgotten Books. (Original work published 1886)

References relating to the Society and noted Fellows
Finn, Elizabeth Anne McCaul. Reminiscences of Mrs. Finn, Member of the Royal Asiatic Society. Marshall, Morgan and Scott, 1929.
Hunter, William Wilson. Life of Brian Houghton Hodgson: British Resident at the Court of Nepal, Member of the Institute of France; Fellow of the Royal Society; a Vice-president of the Royal Asiatic Society, Etc. J. Murray, 1896.
Simmonds, Stuart, Simon Digby. "The Royal Asiatic Society: its history and treasures": In commemoration of the sesquicentenary year of the foundation of the Royal Asiatic Society of Great Britain and Ireland. E. J. Brill, 1979.
Skrine, Francis Henry, William Wilson Hunter. Life of Sir William Wilson Hunter, K.C.S.I., M.A., LL.D., a Vice-president of the Royal Asiatic Society. Longmans, Green, and Co., 1901.
Taintor, Edward C. "The Aborigines of Northern Formosa: A Paper Read Before the North China Branch of the Royal Asiatic Society." Customs Press: Shanghai, 18 June 1874.

External links

Royal Asiatic Society website
Charter of Incorporation of the Royal Asiatic Society of Great Britain and Ireland
Hong Kong branch
Malaysian branch
North China Branch Journal (Full texts of older editions online.)
South Korean branch
Shanghai branch
Sri Lanka branch

1824 establishments in the United Kingdom
Ancient Near East organizations
Clubs and societies in London
Learned societies of the United Kingdom
Organisations based in the United Kingdom with royal patronage
Organizations established in 1824
Asiatic
Asian studies